The 2008 IBAF Women's Baseball World Cup was held in Botchan Stadium at Matsuyama, Ehime, Japan and won by Japan.

Final results

Results

All-Star team

External links
IBAF - 2008 IBAF Women's Baseball World Cup

Women's Baseball World Cup
2000s in women's baseball
2008 in baseball
Women's Baseball World Cup, 2008
2008
Matsuyama, Ehime
August 2008 sports events in Asia
Women's baseball in Japan